Coprosma tenuicaulis, commonly called swamp coprosma is a native shrub of New Zealand. As its name suggests C. tenuicaulis is found in wet, boggy soil in and around swamp or lake areas.

The shrub flowers in early spring and produces black/red fruit that ripen between February and June.

References 

Flora of New Zealand
tenuicaulis
Taxa named by Joseph Dalton Hooker